The National Lottery Community Fund, legally named the Big Lottery Fund, is a non-departmental public body responsible for distributing funds raised by the National Lottery for "good causes". Since 2004 it has awarded over £9 billion to more than 130,000 projects in the UK.

The Community Fund aims to support projects which help communities and people it considers most in need. Over 80 per cent of its funds go to voluntary and community organisations, it also makes grants to statutory bodies, local authorities and social enterprises.

The fund makes grants to projects working in health, education and the environment and the charitable sector. It funds projects in line with objectives set by the government but does not fund services which other parts of government have a statutory responsibility to deliver.

"Additionality" principle 
According to its annual report, Big Lottery Fund uses the following definition of "additionality": "Lottery funding is distinct from Government funding and adds value. Although it does not substitute for Exchequer expenditure, where appropriate it complements Government and other programmes, policies and funding."

Income 
The income of all the Lottery distributors comes from the sale of National Lottery tickets. Of every £2 spent on a Lottery ticket 56 pence (28%) goes to the "good causes". The current operator of the National Lottery is Camelot.

The Community Fund is the largest of the Lottery distributors, with an income of about £600 million a year. The Fund is responsible for distributing 40% of funds raised for "good causes" (roughly 23 pence of every £2 spent on a Lottery ticket).

Funding 
Big Lottery Fund does not operate projects but allocates funds to organisations which operate projects. As part of the application process for funding, the Fund requires funded organisations to outline the difference that should come about as a result of its funding.

The Fund uses several methods to distribute funding. Most of its grants go to voluntary and community organisations which apply within a range of funding programmes. However, in certain cases to meet a specific need, the Fund will also seek applications from organisations with recognised expertise or make a substantial grant to a partner to award funds on its behalf.

Creation 

Big Lottery Fund came into being on 1 June 2004, with the merger of two Lottery distributors – the National Lottery Charities Board (whose operating name was Community Fund) and the New Opportunities Fund. Big Lottery Fund was formally established by the National Lottery Act 2006. The Act gave the new body the extra responsibility of managing projects funded by the Millennium Commission.

Accountability 

The Department for Culture, Media and Sport (DCMS) has overall responsibility for the National Lottery, and Big Lottery Fund receives policy and financial directions from the Office for Civil Society (OCS) within DCMS, alongside the devolved governments of Northern Ireland, Scotland and Wales.

Structure 

The strategic direction of the Big Lottery Fund is decided by a Board made up of a Chair and nine Board members.  The Fund's decision-making on grants is devolved to country committees for each of the four UK countries – England, Wales, Scotland and Northern Ireland. The chairs of these country committees sit on the main Board. Each of the four countries runs their own funding programmes, based on particular priorities and needs.

The Big Lottery Fund Chair is Blondel Cluff CBE. The day-to-day running of Big Lottery Fund is under the responsibility of senior management team, made up of the Chief Executive, five directors and two deputy directors. The current Interim CEO is David Knott.

Funding programmes 

A list of the programmes that the Big Lottery Fund has funded can be found on the Big Lottery Fund website.

Programmes funded include:

Wisdom Bank 
£250,000 was given to the Wisdom Bank, a website project to "harness the experience and skills of people in the 45 to 65 age group for the wider benefit of the community of Torfaen". In two years the site only registered 340 users, before being taken over by Torfaen council. A member of the council's audit committee criticised the spending of further public money on the site and said that lottery funding should not have been given to a project with a flawed business plan and whose purpose could have been equally well served by using social media.

Forces in Mind 

£35 million has been invested by the Big Lottery Fund on the Forces in Mind Trust (FIMT), a partnership of UK forces charities and mental health organisations, led by the Confederation of Service Charities (COBSEO). It has been given partnership support from The Royal Foundation which will back the Trust with its own grants over a three-year programme as well as helping raise awareness of the issues facing veterans. Over the next 20 years, FIMT will provide UK-wide long-term support and advocacy for Service personnel and Veterans to make a successful transition to civilian life. The focus will be on addressing a range of problems that some ex-service personnel and their families can experience back in civilian life, such as poor mental health, family breakdown and alcohol-related problems.

Supporting Change and Impact 

Supporting Change and Impact is an initiative helping the Fund's grant holders, helping them to plan future service delivery in a challenging funding environment.

Heroes Return2 

Heroes Return2 funds veterans, their families, spouses and carers to visit the places where they saw action in the Second World War or to take part in commemorative events in the UK.

Improving Futures 

The Improving Futures programmes helps children from families who have complex and multiple needs.

Big Fund 
The National Lottery Act 2006 gave Big Lottery Fund the powers to handle non-Lottery as well as Lottery funding.

Big Lottery Fund has managed non-Lottery programmes on behalf of OCS, the Department for Education and the Welsh Assembly Government.

The organisation's non-Lottery funding is branded distinctly and promoted independently from Lottery funding.

Big Potential 
The Big Potential programme delivered grant funding to eligible charities and social enterprises with the aim of improving the sustainability, capacity and scale of organisations in order that they may deliver greater social impact. The programme was run by Social Investment Business and its £20m investment pool closed in 2017.

References

External links
 

2004 establishments in the United Kingdom
Cabinet Office (United Kingdom)
Lotteries in the United Kingdom
Non-departmental public bodies of the United Kingdom government
Organisations based in the City of London